Hesperia may refer to:

Places
 Hesperia, ancient name for the Italian Peninsula used by both the Greeks and the Romans
 Hesperia, California, a city in the United States
 Hesperia, Iowa, a former name for Burnside, Iowa, an unincorporated community in the United States
 Hesperia, Michigan, a village in the United States
 Hesperia Planum, a region of Mars
 69 Hesperia, an asteroid

Other uses
 Hesperia (actress) (1885–1959), Italian actress
 Hesperia (butterfly) (branded skippers), a genus in the skipper family, Hesperiidae
 Hesperia (journal), an academic journal of Classical archaeology
 Hesperia (poem), 1867 book-length verse epic by Richard Henry Wilde
 Hesperia (mythology), various people and places in Greek mythology
 Hesperian Foundation, an NGO which publishes Health guides
 Hesperia Hotels, Spanish hotel chain owned by NH Hoteles group
 USS Hesperia (AKS-13), a general stores issue ship

See also
Hesperides (disambiguation)